This is a list of the Austrian Singles Chart number-one hits of 1991.

See also
1991 in music

References

1991 in Austria
1991 record charts
Lists of number-one songs in Austria